The 1950 German Grand Prix was a non-championship Formula Two race held on 20 August 1950 at the Nürburgring Nordschleife.

Report 
Formula 2 regulations had been chosen in order to attract a larger starting grid – especially for German teams and drivers, who would not have had time to prepare cars for the still-new Formula One regulations. This resulted in a large amount of interest – 37 cars started the race, and the event drew a crowd of 400,000 spectators.

During practice, German driver Paul Greifzu was involved in an accident where his car hit a paramedic at Pflanzgarten. The paramedic suffered fatal injuries and Greifzu was taken to hospital with fractured ribs and internal bruising.

The Grand Prix had attracted some of the top German drivers, but many of them retired due to the high level of attrition. Indeed, only 10 drivers completed the full distance. Hans Stuck ran sixth after the first lap, but had to stop to fix a stuck throttle. He received outside assistance whilst starting his engine again, and was disqualified. Manfred von Brauchitsch put in a fine performance trying to keep up with the leaders, running as high as seventh before retiring with engine failure.

The race was dominated by Alberto Ascari, who led from pole and pulled away comfortably each lap. The only slight drama came on the final tour: he had run the full distance without pitting, and some spokes on his right rear wheel broke in the banked Karussell. However, such was his lead that he could afford to significantly reduce his pace, nursing the car home to victory.

For his dominant performance, Ascari was presented with the Silbernes Lorbeerblatt (Silver Laurel Leaf), the highest award in German sport. The award had only been established two months prior, and he became its first foreign recipient.

Entries

Classification

References 

German Grand Prix
1950 in German motorsport